Uncle Tetsu's Cheesecake is a Japanese bakery chain that sells cheesecake as its signature dish. It originally opened in Japan in 1990 as a bakery shop on Oyafukou Street in the ward of Hakata-ku in the city of Fukuoka. The founder, serves as the namesake for the modern-day global chain.

An Uncle Tetsu's branch opened in Taiwan in 2011, and the cakes became highly popular after being reported on by local television talk show Kangsi Coming. Outside of Japan, the brand has also more than 70 shops active across China, as well as in Hong Kong, Singapore, Thailand, Malaysia, the Philippines, Indonesia, Cambodia, New Zealand, Australia, Canada, the United States, Pakistan, Saudi Arabia, and Qatar.

Popularity

In China 
Uncle Tetsu's entered the Chinese market in 2013, and its products became popular in Shanghai, with customers queueing for hours and purchases being limited to two items per person; because of their widespread popularity, the cheesecakes' sales are limited to one per buyer. There is limited oven capacity, and this makes the line shorter.

International outlets 

The first Uncle Tetsu's outside of Asia opened in 2015, in Toronto, Canada. There are currently over 45 outlets around Japan; with 11 in Malaysia, 9 in Indonesia, and 8 in Taiwan. Stores opened in the Australian cities of Sydney and Melbourne in 2016 and late 2017, respectively; and a branch opened in Auckland, New Zealand, around the same time as Melbourne. Other branches of the chain are present across the United States, particularly in the cities of Waikiki, Los Angeles, and San Mateo. There are thirteen stores in Canada, including in the cities of Toronto, Richmond Hill, Markham, Ottawa, Montreal, Vancouver, and Burnaby. An Uncle Tetsu's outlet opened in Lahore, Pakistan, in 2019.

Design space 
The outlets are known for their warm red-and-white interiors and open-space kitchens, which allow customers to see the desserts being made.

See also 

 Japanese cuisine

References

External links
Uncle Tetsu Canada: English
Uncle Tetsu's Japanese Angel Cafe

Cakes
Food and drink companies of Japan